The  was held on 2 February 1997 in Kannai Hall, Yokohama, Kanagawa, Japan.

Awards
 Best Film: Kids Return
 Best Actor:
Tadanobu Asano – Picnic, Focus, Helpless, Acri
Kōji Yakusho – Shall We Dance?, Nemuru Otoko, Shabu Gokudō
 Best Actress: Eri Fukatsu – Haru
 Best Supporting Actor: Ryo Ishibashi – Kids Return
 Best Supporting Actress: Reiko Kusamura – Shall We Dance?
 Best Director: Masayuki Suo – Shall We Dance?
 Best New Director: Sabu – Dangan Runner
 Best Screenplay: Yoshimitsu Morita – Haru
 Best Cinematography: Katsumi Yanagishima – Kids Return
 Best New Talent:
Masanobu Andō – Kids Return
Chara – Picnic, Swallowtail
Tamiyo Kusakari – Shall We Dance?
 Special Jury Prize: Kaizo Hayashi – Waga Jinsei Saiaku no Toki, Harukana Jidai no Kaidan o, and Wana
 Special Prize: Tetsuya Watari Waga Kokoro no Ginga Tetsudō: Miyazawa Kenji Monogatari (Career)

Best 10
 Kids Return
 Shall We Dance?
 Boys Be Ambitious
 Haru
 Biriken
 Tokiwasō no Seishun
 Ohigara mo Yoku Goshūshōsama
 Shabu Gokudō
 Gamera 2: Attack of Legion
 Okaeri
runner-up. Swallowtail

References

Yokohama Film Festival
1997 film festivals
1997 in Japanese cinema
Yoko
February 1997 events in Asia